Think About It may refer to:

Albums
Think About It!, by Kate Ceberano, 1991
Think About It, by Kevn Kinney, 2022

Songs
"Think About It" (Melanie C song), 2011
"Think About It" (Naughty Boy song), 2013
"Think (About It)", by Lyn Collins, 1972
"Think About It", by Flight of the Conchords from the Flight of the Conchords TV episode "Mugged", 2007
"Think About It", by Rich Homie Quan from Rich as in Spirit, 2018
"Think About It", by Special Ed from Youngest in Charge, 1989
"Think About It", by Thundamentals, 2016
"Think About It", by the Yardbirds, 1968

See also
"Let Me Think About It", a song by Ida Corr and Fedde le Grand, 2007